Tennessee Firebird is an album by vibraphonist Gary Burton recorded in 1966 and released on the RCA label in 1967. The session featured both jazz and country musicians, including guitarist Chet Atkins, saxophonist Steve Marcus, fiddler Buddy Spicher, harmonica player Charlie McCoy and drummer Roy Haynes.

Reception
The Allmusic review by Ron Wynn stated: "While the concept of 'jazz-rock' was in its embryonic stages, Burton was experimenting with a style combining jazz improvisation with rock energy and rhythms. This 1967 session added another ingredient to the musical mix: country and bluegrass sensibility".

Track listing
All compositions by Gary Burton, except as indicated
 "Gone" (Smokey Rogers) - 4:52 
 "Tennessee Firebird" - 2:57 
 "Just Like a Woman" (Bob Dylan) - 3:48 
 "Black Is the Color of My True Love's Hair" (Traditional) - 1:53 
 "Faded Love" (Bob Wills, John Wills, Billy Jack Wills) - 3:22 
 "Panhandle Rag" (Leon McAuliffe) - 1:33 Bonus track on CD reissue
 "I Can't Help It (If I'm Still in Love With You)" (Hank Williams) - 2:54 
 "I Want You" (Dylan) - 3:28 
 "Alone and Forsaken" (Williams) - 2:49 
 "Walter L." - 4:41 
 "Born to Lose" (Ted Daffan) - 2:43 
 "Beauty Contest" - 1:25 
 "Epilogue" - 0:23 
Recorded at RCA Victor´s "Nashville Sound" Studio in Nashville, Tennessee on September 19–21, 1966.

Personnel
Gary Burton — vibraphone, piano, organ
Steve Marcus — soprano saxophone, tenor saxophone 
Buddy Emmons — steel guitar 
Sonny Osborne — banjo 
Buddy Spicher — fiddle 
Chet Atkins, Jimmy Colvard, Ray Edenton — guitar 
Charlie McCoy — harmonica 
Bobby Osborne — mandolin 
Henry Strzelecki, Steve Swallow — bass  
Kenneth Buttrey, Roy Haynes — drums

References

RCA Records albums
Gary Burton albums
1967 albums
Albums produced by Chet Atkins